The New Mexico lunar sample displays are two commemorative plaques consisting of small fragments of Moon specimen brought back with the Apollo 11 and Apollo 17 lunar missions and given in the 1970s to the people of the state of New Mexico by United States President Richard Nixon as goodwill gifts.

Description

Apollo 11

Apollo 17

History 
The New Mexico Apollo 11 lunar sample display was presented to then-Republican Governor David F. Cargo. When the new Democratic Governor of New Mexico Bruce King came into office in 1971, he argued that Cargo should not have taken the display. Cargo claimed that the plaque was his.

A Museum of New Mexico representative checked the White House records, which showed that the display belonged to the people of New Mexico. 

According to Moon rocks researcher Robert Pearlman, the New Mexico Apollo 11 lunar sample display is exhibited at the Palace of the Governors, a division of the Museum of New Mexico. The New Mexico Apollo 17 goodwill Moon rocks display is at the Roswell Museum and Art Center in Roswell, New Mexico.

See also
 List of Apollo lunar sample displays

References

Further reading 

 
 
 
 
 
 
 

Stolen and missing moon rocks
Tourist attractions in New Mexico